Campbellsville is an unincorporated community in Giles County, Tennessee, United States.

History
The settlement is named for Hamilton Crockett Campbell, an early settler.

A post office was established in 1824.  By 1860, Campbellsville had a hotel, an Independent Order of Odd Fellows lodge, two general stores, two grocery stores, two churches, two mills, and a population of 150.  In 1924, Campbellsville High School opened, and served the community until 1978.

Campbellsville hosts a heritage festival each October.

Notable people
 Donald Davidson - poet
 Thomas Hackney - U.S. Representative from Missouri

References

External links
 Campbellsville Area Association

Unincorporated communities in Giles County, Tennessee
Unincorporated communities in Tennessee